The 2014 6 Hours of Sao Paulo was an endurance sports car racing event held at the Autódromo José Carlos Pace, Sao Paulo, Brazil on 28–30 November 2014, and served as the eighth and last race of the 2014 FIA World Endurance Championship season.

Qualifying

Qualifying result
Pole position winners in each class are marked in bold.

Race

Race result
Class winners in bold.

References

6 Hours of São Paulo
2014 in Brazilian motorsport
Sao Paulo